The 1991 Cleveland Indians season was the 91st season for the franchise. The Indians lost 105 games, the most losses in franchise history.

Offseason
 December 3, 1990: Mike Huff was drafted by the Indians from the Los Angeles Dodgers in the 1990 rule 5 draft.
 December 4, 1990: Cory Snyder and Lindsay Foster (minors) were traded by the Indians to the Chicago White Sox for Shawn Hillegas and Eric King.
 January 11, 1991: Luis Lopez was signed as a free agent by the Indians.
 January 16, 1991: Dave Otto was signed as a free agent by the Indians.
 January 16, 1991: Troy Neel was traded by the Indians to the Oakland Athletics for Larry Arndt.

Regular season

On May 4, 1991, Chris James had 9 RBIs in a 20 to 6 win over the Oakland Athletics to set the single game RBI record for Cleveland.

Season standings

This is to date the most recent season the Indians have finished last in their division.

Record vs. opponents

Game log

|- style="text-align:center;"
| Legend:       = Win       = Loss       = PostponementBold = Indians team member

Notable transactions
 May 17, 1991: Mike Aldrete was signed as a free agent by the Indians.
 June 3, 1991: Paul Byrd was drafted by the Indians in the 4th round of the 1991 Major League Baseball draft. Player signed June 10, 1991.
 June 14, 1991: Tim Costo was traded by the Indians to the Cincinnati Reds for Reggie Jefferson.
 June 27, 1991: Tom Candiotti and Turner Ward were traded by the Indians to the Toronto Blue Jays for Glenallen Hill, Denis Boucher, Mark Whiten, and cash.
 July 5, 1991: Stan Jefferson was released by the Indians.
 July 12, 1991: Mike Huff was selected off waivers from the Indians by the Chicago White Sox.
 July 26, 1991: Brook Jacoby was traded by the Indians to the Oakland Athletics for Lee Tinsley and Apolinar Garcia (minors).

Opening Day Lineup

Roster

Statistics

Batting
Note: G = Games played; AB = At bats; R = Runs scored; H = Hits; 2B = Doubles; 3B = Triples; HR = Home runs; RBI = Runs batted in; AVG = Batting average; SB = Stolen bases

Pitching
Note: W = Wins; L = Losses; ERA = Earned run average; G = Games pitched; GS = Games started; SV = Saves; IP = Innings pitched; R = Runs allowed; ER = Earned runs allowed; BB = Walks allowed; K = Strikeouts

Awards and honors

All-Star Game
 Sandy Alomar Jr., catcher, starter

Farm system 

LEAGUE CHAMPIONS: Kinston

References

External links
1991 Cleveland Indians at Baseball Reference
1991 Cleveland Indians at Baseball Almanac

Cleveland Guardians seasons
Cleveland Indians season
Cleve